Miles Field was an outdoor athletics venue of Virginia Agricultural and Mechanical College and Polytechnic Institute in Blacksburg, Virginia. It was in use from 1894 to 1926, hosting football, baseball, and track events.

History
University president John McLaren McBryde designated part of an horticulture farm known as Sheib Field for athletic and military drill use in 1894.  In 1902, a grandstand was built and the name changed to Gibboney Field. The area was graded and leveled, grandstand enlarged, and then renamed as Miles Field in 1909. 

Miles Field was succeeded with the completion of Miles Stadium in 1926.

References

1894 establishments in Virginia
American football venues in Virginia
Athletics (track and field) venues in Virginia
Baseball venues in Virginia
Defunct college football venues
Defunct college baseball venues in the United States
Defunct athletics (track and field) venues in the United States
Defunct sports venues in Virginia
Sports venues completed in 1894
Virginia Tech Hokies football venues